Elaphropus carvalhoi is a species of ground beetle in the subfamily Trechinae. It was described by Bruneau De Mire in 1966.

References

Beetles described in 1966